Zakaria El Azzouzi (born 7 May 1996) is a Dutch-Moroccan professional footballer who plays as a forward.

Club career
El Azzouzi was born in Rotterdam. He is a youth exponent from AFC Ajax. He made his professional debut at 21 August 2015 with Jong Ajax against NAC Breda. He played the full game, a 3–0 loss. On 22 January 2016, El Azzouzi was sent on loan to FC Twente for the rest of the season and he joined newly promoted Sparta on loan for the 2016–17 season.

He was without a club after his contract with Ajax was dissolved in December 2018.

On 7 March 2019, El Azzouzi signed a six-month contract with an option for an additional year with Emmen after being a free agent for two months. However, the club failed to register him, which meant that he did not make an official appearance during his stint at the club.

On 20 June 2019, Volendam announced that they had signed El Azzouzi as their first new addition ahead the 2019–20 season. He signed a two-year contract with an option for another year. During his unofficial debut, on 6 July against Hoofdklasse club VPV Purmersteijn, he also scored his first goal for the club.

International career
El Azzouzi was born in the Netherlands to parents of Moroccan descent. He represented Morocco in the 2013 African U-17 Championship.

Personal life
On 12 March 2015, when El Azzouzi played in the youth academy of Ajax, he was arrested along with teammates Samet Bulut and Aschraf El Mahdioui for assaulting a plainclothed policewoman. The officer suffered shoulder injuries and various bruises. She later filed charges against the three players. A day later, Ajax announced in an official message that they had suspended the players. Later that week, El Azzouzi remained the only suspect in the case. They were, however, allowed make appearances for the Ajax A1 youth side again after serving a month suspension. As punishment, he had to inform the youth players of Ajax together with Bulut and El Mahdioui.

References

External links
 

1996 births
Living people
Footballers from Rotterdam
Dutch sportspeople of Moroccan descent
Association football forwards
Dutch footballers
Moroccan footballers
Morocco under-20 international footballers
Jong Ajax players
FC Twente players
Sparta Rotterdam players
Excelsior Rotterdam players
FC Emmen players
FC Volendam players
FC Brașov (2021) players
Eredivisie players
Eerste Divisie players
Liga II players
Moroccan expatriate footballers
Expatriate footballers in Romania
Moroccan expatriate sportspeople in Romania